Accademia Gioenia di Catania founded
Death of Pierre Antoine Delalande
Martin Lichtenstein describes the mourning wheatear, the chalk-browed mockingbird, the white-tailed lapwing, the kelp gull, Bachman's sparrow and other new bird species in Verzeichniss der Doubletten des Zooligeschen Museums der Universitat Berlin
Louis de Freycinet is honoured in the bird name Megapodius freycinet
Thomas Say publishes new bird species in James, E. "Account of an expedition from Pittsburgh to the Rocky Mountains, performed in the years 1819, '20, by order of the Hon. J. C. Calhoun, Secretary of War, under the command of Major Stephen H. Long." One is the rock wren
Charles Dumont de Sainte-Croix describes jungle babbler, orange-footed scrubfowl, common babbler and rough-crested malkoha in Dictionnaire des Sciences naturelles (see 1804)
Joseph Paul Gaimard describes the Micronesian megapode.
Wilhelm Hemprich and Christian Gottfried Ehrenberg  explore Egypt, the Libyan desert, the Nile valley and the northern coasts of the Red Sea and subsequently parts of Syria, Jupiter, Arabia and Abyssinia. The specimens collected by the expedition were deposited at the Berlin's Natural History Museum.

Expeditions
1823-26 "Predprijaetje", in English Enterprise. All the oceans and the first to Bikini atolls. The captain was Otto von Kotzebue, Johann Friedrich von Eschscholtz and Heinrich Friedrich Emil Lenz were surgeon naturalists.

Ongoing events
Louis Jean Pierre Vieillot Tableau encyclopédique et méthodique des trois regnes de la nature. New species described in 1823 in this work are  three species of  tyrant flycatchers, the black-and-white monjita, the  white monjita and the black-crowned monjita

Birding and ornithology by year
1823 in science